Gega is a surname. Notable people with the surname include:

Armand Gega (born 1987), Albanian footballer
Fatbardha Gega (1919-1999), Albanian pedagogist
Liri Gega (1917–1956), Albanian communist activist and politician
Luiza Gega (born 1988), Albanian athlete
Marta Gęga (born 1986), Polish handballer
Mehmet Gega (1921-2006), Albanian educator and activist
Ndoc Mark Gega (c. 1830-1908?), Albanian activist
Ornel Gega (born 1990), Albanian-born Italian rugby union player
Skënder Gega (born 1963), Albanian footballer
Sin Boy (born 1994) Theodore Agustin Gega Albanian Rapper